Microshogi (五分摩訶将棋 gofun maka shōgi "5-minute (scarlet) poppy chess") is a modern variant of shogi (Japanese chess), with very different rules for promotion, and demotion. Kerry Handscomb of NOST gave it this English name. Although not confirmed, he credits its invention to the late Oyama Yasuharu, one of the most famous professional shogi players in history. The game was invented before 1982.

Equipment
Two players play on a board ruled into a grid of 5 ranks (rows) by 4 files (columns). The squares are undifferentiated by marking or color.

Each player has a set of 5 wedge-shaped pieces.  The pieces are of slightly different sizes. From largest to smallest (or most to least powerful) they are:

1 king
1 bishop
1 gold general
1 silver general
1 pawn

Game rules
The game is identical to standard shogi with the following exceptions.

Setup

Each side places his pieces in the following positions, pointing toward the opponent.  For more information see the ChessVariants.com page on micro shogi.

In the rank nearest the player:
The king is placed in the right corner
The bishop is placed in the adjacent file to the king.
The gold general is placed adjacent to the bishop.
The silver general is placed adjacent to the gold general in the left corner.

That is, the first rank is |S|G|B|K|.

In the second rank, each player places the pawn in the same file as the king.

Promotion
Unlike standard shogi, microshogi has no promotion zone. Instead, a piece promotes when it captures, and promotion is mandatory. When a promoted piece captures, it demotes—that is, it is flipped back over to show its original unpromoted value.

Promotion values are entirely different from standard shogi:

A king does not promote: K
A silver general becomes a lance and vice versa: S ↔ L
A bishop becomes a tokin (T) and vice versa: B ↔ T
A gold general becomes a rook and vice versa: G ↔ R
A pawn becomes a knight and vice versa: P ↔ N

Thus when a lance, tokin, rook, or knight makes a capture, it reverts to its former state.

A knight which reaches one of the two far ranks is trapped, as is a pawn which captures and thus promotes there. Likewise, a pawn that reaches the far rank is trapped, as is a knight which captures there. A lance is also trapped at the far rank, but can escape if it captures there and thus demotes to a silver. A silver which captures in the far rank and therefore promotes to a lance is trapped.

Any trapped piece may be captured and returned to play as part of the opposing army.

A tokin moves the same way as a golden general.

Drops
Drops are similar to standard shogi, except that:

A player may drop a piece with either side facing up.
There are no restrictions when dropping pawns. That is, a player may have two unpromoted pawns on the same file, a piece can be dropped with no legal moves later, and a pawn can be dropped to give immediate checkmate.

See also
Shogi variant
Tori shogi
Minishogi
Judkins shogi
Kyoto shogi
Cannon shogi
Yari shogi

Notes

External links
 Shogi Net
 Shogi: Japanese Chess
 Chessvariants.com

Shogi variants